Jennifer J. Stewart is an American children's writer. She writes humorous books for young children and middle grade (upper elementary school) readers. She also writes educational nonfiction for children under the pen name J.J. Stewart.

She was born in East Patchogue, New York, to a librarian mother and a physicist father.  When she was four years old, her family moved to Tucson, Arizona, where she grew up and attended Whitmore Elementary, Townsend Junior High, and Catalina High.  She received an honors degree in English from Wellesley College, followed by an M.B.A. from the University of Utah.

She is a past president and founding board member of Make Way for Books. She and her husband volunteer with The Flying Samaritans.

Published books 
Her books include:

If That Breathes Fire, We're Toast!
The Bean King's Daughter
Close Encounters of a Third-World Kind
The Twelve Days of Christmas in Arizona
The Girl Who Has Everything
Justin Trudeau (as J. J. Stewart)
Grand Canyon National Park (as J. J. Stewart)

Awards
Her first novel, If That Breathes Fire, We’re Toast! was named to VOYA's Best Fantasy list and the Oklahoma Sequoyah Book Award master list.

Her third novel, Close Encounters of a Third-World Kind, is loosely based upon her family's real life adventures working as medical volunteers in the Kingdom of Nepal. It has been nominated for Connecticut's 2009 Nutmeg Book Award, Maryland's 2007-2008 Black-Eyed Susan Book Award, and Arizona's 2007 Grand Canyon Reader Award. The novel is on recommended reading lists for Kansas, Missouri, and South Carolina.

Her picture book, The Twelve Days of Christmas in Arizona, illustrated by Lynne Avril, was a finalist for the 2011 Crystal Kite award, given by the Society of Children's Book Writers and Illustrators, and received the Glyph Award, given by the Arizona Book Publishing Association, also in 2011.

References

External links

 
 

American children's writers
Wellesley College alumni
University of Utah alumni
Living people
People from East Patchogue, New York
Year of birth missing (living people)
American women children's writers
21st-century American women